Rumex arcticus, commonly known as arctic dock or sourdock, is a perennial flowering plant that is native to Alaska. Its leaves are an important part of the diet of the Alaska Natives such as the Yup'ik people, who include it in various dishes such as akutaq.

References

 University of Alaska and USDA Cooperating (1988) Wild Edible and Poisonous Plants of Alaska.  Publication A-00028

External links
 
 
 

arcticus